Nasarawa may referred to:
Nasarawa State
Nasarawa, Nasarawa State
Nasarawa, Kano State